Zombor can refer to:

 Zombor (Зомбор), a Hungarian and Rusyn name for Sombor, a city in Serbia
 Zombor, Veľký Krtíš District, a village in Slovakia.

eo:Zombor